Sašo Ožbolt (born 4 April 1981) is a Slovenian retired professional basketball player who played for KK Portorož of the Slovenian League. He represented the Slovenian national basketball team at the 2006 FIBA World Championship and Eurobasket 2011.

External links 

 Sašo Ožbolt at abaliga.com
Sašo Ožbolt at eurobasket.com
Sašo Ožbolt at fiba.com
Sašo Ožbolt at Euroleague.net

1981 births
Living people
ABA League players
KD Slovan players
KK Olimpija players
KK Zagreb players
Slovenian men's basketball players
Basketball players from Dubrovnik
2006 FIBA World Championship players
Guards (basketball)